Rana Muhammad Qasim Noon (born 10 November 1962) is a Pakistani politician who has been a member of the National Assembly of Pakistan since August 2018. Previously, he was a member of the National Assembly from March 2016 to April 2018 and a member of the Provincial Assembly of the Punjab from 2002 to 2007.

Early life and education
Noon was born on 10 November 1962.

He received MA degree in Political Science from Bahauddin Zakariya University in 1983. He received his L.L.B. degree in 1988 and MA degree in 1989, both from Bahauddin Zakariya University.

Political career
Prior to entering politics, Noon served as Chief Protocol Officer in Pakistan International Airlines from 1985 to 1990.

He ran for the seat of the National Assembly of Pakistan as a candidate of Pakistan Muslim League (Q) (PML-Q) from Constituency NA-153 (Multan-VI) in 2002 Pakistani general election but was unsuccessful. He received 55,395 votes and lost the seat to Dewan Syed Jaffar Hussain Bukhari, a candidate of Pakistan Muslim League (N) (PML-N). In the same election, he was elected to the Provincial Assembly of the Punjab as a candidate of PML-Q from Constituency PP-205 (Multan-XII). He received 25,902 votes and defeated Mehdi Abbas Khan.

In November 2003, he was inducted into the Punjab provincial cabinet of Chief Minister Chaudhry Pervaiz Elahi and was appointed Provincial Minister of Punjab for Agriculture Marketing where he served until November 2006. During his tenure as Member of the Punjab Assembly, he also served as Provincial Minister of Punjab for Labour and Human Resource.

He ran for the seat of the National Assembly as an independent candidate from Constituency NA-153 (Multan-VI) in 2008 Pakistani general election but was unsuccessful. He received 68,762 votes and lost the seat to Syed Ashiq Hussain Bukhari, a candidate of PML-Q.

He ran for the seat of the National Assembly as a candidate of Pakistan Peoples Party (PPP) from Constituency NA-153 (Multan-VI) in 2013 Pakistani general election but was unsuccessful. He received 90,179 votes and lost the seat to Syed Ashiq Hussain Bukhari. Following the defeat in the elections, he quit PPP and joined Pakistan Tehreek-e-Insaf (PTI). He quit PTI and joined Pakistan Muslim League (N) (PML-N) in 2016.

He was elected to the National Assembly as a candidate of PML-N from Constituency NA-153 (Multan-VI) in by-elections held in March 2016. He received 107,737 votes and defeated Malik Ghulam Abbas, a candidate of Pakistan Tehreek-e-Insaf (PTI).

In April 2018, he quit PML-N and resigned from the National Assembly. In May 2018, he announced to join PTI.

He was re-elected to the National Assembly as a candidate of PTI from Constituency NA-159 (Multan-VI) in 2018 Pakistani general election. During No Confidence motion against prime minister Imran Khan he joined hands with opposition.

References 

Living people
1962 births
Pakistani MNAs 2013–2018
Punjab MPAs 2002–2007
Pakistan Muslim League (Q) MPAs (Punjab)
Pakistan Muslim League (N) MNAs
Pakistan Tehreek-e-Insaf MNAs
Pakistani MNAs 2018–2023